Swiftsure may refer to:
HMS Swiftsure, the Royal Navy has had ten ships named HMS Swiftsure since 1573
Swiftsure (1811 brig)
Swiftsure-class submarine, a class of nuclear-powered fleet submarines in service with the Royal Navy from the early 1970s until 2010
Swiftsure Yacht Race
United States lightship Swiftsure (LV-83)